was a Korean-style fortress located in Tsushima, Nagasaki prefecture. Kaneda castle has been designated as being of national special significance.

History
Kaneda Castle was built by Yamato court. Following the defeat of Yamato Japan in the 663 battle of Hakusukinoe by an alliance of Tang China and the Silla, Emperor Tenji ordered the construction of defenses against a possible invasion of them.

The castle was listed as one of the Continued Top 100 Japanese Castles in 2017.

See also
List of Historic Sites of Japan (Nagasaki)
List of foreign-style castles in Japan

Literature

References

External links 
Kaneda castle, Tsushima city official

Castles in Nagasaki Prefecture
Ruined castles in Japan
History of Nagasaki Prefecture
Historic Sites of Japan